Yuri Aleksandrovich Matveyev (born 8 June 1967) is a Russian association football coach and a former player.

International career
Matveyev made his debut for Russia in a friendly against Mexico on 16 August 1992. That was the first game Russia played under its name after the breakup of USSR.

Honours
 Soviet Premier League bronze: 1991.
 Soviet Cup runner-up: 1991.
 Top 33 players year-end list: 1992, 1998.
 Top scorer in Russian Premier League: 1992 (20 goals in 28 games).

Coaching career
Following several stints as a caretaker manager for FC Ural Yekaterinburg, he was hired as a permanent manager on 28 July 2020. On 10 August 2021, he left Ural by mutual consent.

References

External links
 
 Player profile 
 

1967 births
Living people
Soviet footballers
Association football forwards
Russian footballers
Russia international footballers
Russian expatriate footballers
Expatriate footballers in Turkey
Expatriate footballers in South Korea
FC Ural Yekaterinburg players
Russian Premier League players
FC Zenit Saint Petersburg players
FC Torpedo Moscow players
MKE Ankaragücü footballers
PFC CSKA Moscow players
Suwon Samsung Bluewings players
FC Rostov players
FC Lokomotiv Nizhny Novgorod players
K League 1 players
FC Ural Yekaterinburg managers
Russian football managers
Russian expatriate sportspeople in South Korea
Soviet Top League players
Russian Premier League managers
FC Uralets Nizhny Tagil players
People from Nizhny Tagil
Sportspeople from Sverdlovsk Oblast